Nocturnin is a human hydrolase enzyme that is involved in metabolism and its expression is controlled by the rhythmic circadian clock. It is encoded by the NOCT gene located on chromosome 4. Nocturnin contains a c-terminal structural domain of the Endonuclease/Exonuclease/phosphatase family. A study in January 2019, demonstrated that NADP+ and NADPH are the direct targets of Nocturnin.

The Drosophila melanogaster ortholog of Nocturnin is Curled. Knockouts of Curled lead to the curled wing phenotype in fruit flies.  The curled wing phenotype was first discovered by Thomas Hunt Morgan in 1915. In mice the  Nocturnin ortholog is responsible for controlling diet and weight-gain, knockout mice do not gain weight when placed on a high-fat diet, when compared to normal mice containing Nocturnin. In mice it has also been shown that Nocturnin is rhythmically expressed even when mice are placed in complete darkness, demonstrating that Nocturnin expression is driven by our body's internal clock.

Cellular localization

Nocturnin was shown to have a Mitochondrial targeting sequence, which is located on the n-terminus of the protein. The targeting sequence of Nocturnin is cleaved off at the mitochondria to allow entry.

Enzymatic activity
Nocturnin was previously thought to deadenylate mRNAs of metabolic genes, but two studies in 2018 found that Nocturnin does not directly possess ribonuclease activity. A study in January  2019 demonstrated that human Nocturnin is a phosphatase that acts directly on NADP(H) to remove the 2' phosphate. Curled, the Drosophila ortholog, was also shown to be an NADP(H) 2' phosphatase, which indicates that the enzymatic activity is conserved from humans to fruit flies.

Structure
Nocturnin contains a c-terminal structural domain of the Endonuclease/Exonuclease/phosphatase family (EEP). Its protein fold is similar to that of DNase I, AP endonuclease, INPP5B, Sphingomyelin phosphodiesterase, TDP2, PDE12, and CNOT6L. As in the other EEP members, five conserved catalytic residues help coordinate a Magnesium atom, for Nocturnin the divalent metal participates in the NADP(H) phosphatase activity. The first structures of human Nocturnin were solved in 2017-2018 (6BT1, 6BT2, and 6MAL). All three were of the c-terminal EEP-like domain of Nocturnin bound to its cofactor magnesium. In December 2018, the first structure of Nocturnin bound to its natural substrate, NADPH, was determined, 6NF0.

References

External links 
 

Enzymes of known structure
Genes on human chromosome 4